Basketbalový Klub Brno, currently officially BK Žabiny Brno, previously also known as Imos Brno for sponsorship reasons, is a Czech women's basketball club from Brno established in 1993, not to be mistaken with male club BC VS Brno. It has been the most successful team in the Czech league following the dissolution of Czechoslovakia, dominating the championship between 1996 and 2008. In 2005 it reached the Euroleague final but lost to CSKA Moscow, and the following year it became the second Czech European champion in its arena in a rematch of the previous final. In 2008 it again hosted and reached the final, but lost against defending champion Spartak Moscow Region. In recent years it has fought with USK Prague for the national championship while remaining a regular in the Euroleague.

Titles
 Euroleague (1)
 2006
 ZBL (14)
 1996, 1997, 1998, 1999, 2000, 2001, 2002, 2003, 2004, 2005, 2006, 2007, 2008, 2010

2012-13 roster
 (1.95)  Anna Jurčenková
 (1.93)  Nicole Ohlde
 (1.91)  Alena Hanušová
 (1.91)  Aneta Mainclová
 (1.90)  Edita Šujanová
 (1.89)  Tereza Pecková
 (1.88)  Farhiya Abdi
 (1.88)  Miloslava Sibalová
 (1.85)  Barbora Kasparková
 (1.84)  Romana Hejdová
 (1.83)  Klara Krivanková
 (1.82)  Hana Horáková
 (1.79)  Michaela Vacková
 (1.76)  Sarah Veránková
 (1.75)  Veronika Vlková

Famous players
  Kamila Vodičková
  Jelena Škerović

References

Sport in Brno
Women's basketball teams in the Czech Republic
Basketball teams established in 1993
EuroLeague Women clubs